The Poky Little Puppy is a children's book written by Janette Sebring Lowrey and illustrated by  Gustaf Tenggren. It was first published in 1942 as one of the first twelve books in the Simon & Schuster series Little Golden Books. The copyright was renewed in October 1969.

The Poky Little Puppy is a story about five puppies of undetermined breed. As of 2001, The Poky Little Puppy was the single all-time best-selling hardcover children's book in the U.S., having sold nearly 15 million copies. While the book has outsold many other famous books such as Dr. Seuss' Green Eggs and Ham, Lowrey herself (who also wrote stories about children in her home state of Texas) remained in relative obscurity until her death.

Synopsis
Instead of following his siblings when they all sneak out to play (although their mother has warned them that they can go out and play, but never dig holes under the fences so they can go to other yards), the titular character lags behind to observe other things. In the beginning, his independence is rewarded. The puppies had all dug a hole underneath the fence to escape from their yard (instead of playing in their own backyard), but only the Poky Little Puppy's siblings are caught. The Poky Little Puppy avoids punishment because he is away exploring as his mother scolds his siblings, and he comes home alone after everyone is asleep. The Poky Little Puppy then eats the rice pudding that the mother was planning to give all the puppies but withheld because of the fence-digging incident. Not knowing that he is going to be punished, he secretly eats up the rice pudding and crawls into bed happy as a lark.

This pattern then repeats itself, only with chocolate custard for dessert instead of rice pudding. Once again, the Poky Little Puppy avoids punishment while everyone else is asleep. He eats up the chocolate custard withheld because of the fence digging incident. Again, not knowing he is going to be punished, he secretly eats the chocolate custard too, and again crawls into bed happy as a lark.

Only at the end of the book does fate catch up with the Poky Little Puppy. When the puppies are sent to bed without dessert a third time (this time being strawberry shortcake), they wait until they think their mother is sleeping, then sneak out of bed and fill in the hole they'd dug under the fence. The mother sees them doing this and tells them to come have strawberry shortcake. The Poky Little Puppy not only arrives too late to get any strawberry shortcake, but is forced to squeeze between the fence boards since the hole has been filled in. Then when he sees his four brothers and sisters licking the last crumbs from their saucers (last crumbs from the shortcake), his mother notes her sympathy about Poky's behavior. She says to him, "Dear me...! What a pity! You are so poky! Now the strawberry shortcake is all gone!". The book concludes with Poky Little Puppy having to go to bed without a single bite from the shortcake and feeling "very sorry for himself". The next day there is a sign outside (to where the puppies read including the Poky Little Puppy). Reading it, the sign says "NO DESSERTS EVER...! ...UNLESS PUPPIES NEVER DIG HOLES UNDER THIS FENCE AGAIN!"

Adaptations 
A Christmas special, The Poky Little Puppy's First Christmas, aired on Showtime on December 13, 1992.

See also 

 Poky and Friends

References

External links 
 Roth, Gabriel. "Why So Poky? The scourge of terrible canonical children’s books", Slate (June 2, 2015).

1942 children's books
American picture books
Books about dogs
Little Golden Books